The Northampton Seamounts are a small group of seamounts near the Midway Atoll. It consists of two unnamed seamounts: one that is elliptical, the other shaped like a 'V'.

References 

Seamounts of the Pacific Ocean